Baldwins Halt railway station served the area of Crymlyn Burrows, in the historical county of Glamorganshire, Wales, from 1924 to 1933 on the Rhondda and Swansea Bay Railway.

History 
The station  opened for workmen from 3 October 1910 and was known as Crymlyn Burrows. It appeared in the timetable from 10 July 1911 to 30 September 1911. It also appeared in Bradshaw in December 1922. Its life as a public station was short-lived from being opened to the public on 24 November 1924 and closing on 11 September 1933.

References 

Disused railway stations in Neath Port Talbot
Railway stations in Great Britain opened in 1924
Railway stations in Great Britain closed in 1933
1924 establishments in Wales
1933 disestablishments in Wales
Former Great Western Railway stations